The 2022–23 season is Hamilton Academical's second season back in the second tier of Scottish football, following their relegation from the Scottish Premiership at the end of the 2020–21 season. Hamilton will also compete in the League Cup, Challenge Cup and the Scottish Cup.

Summary

Management
Former Hamilton player and assistant manager Stuart Taylor returned to the club after being appointed as their new head coach on 20 August 2021.

Taylor would step down from his role on 23 June 2022 after 10 months in charge. John Rankin, who had been first-team coach under Taylor, was promoted to the position of head coach 5 days later.

Results and fixtures

Pre-season and friendlies

Scottish Championship

Scottish League Cup

Group stage

Scottish Challenge Cup

Scottish Cup

Squad statistics

Appearances
As of 18 March 2023

|-
|colspan="10"|Players who left the club during the 2022–23 season
|-

|}

Team statistics

League table

League Cup table

Transfers

In

Out

References

Hamilton Academical F.C. seasons
Hamilton Academical